Taylor John Smith (born May 13, 1995) is an American actor. He is known for his role as John Keene in the series Sharp Objects. Notable films in which he has appeared are Wolves (2016), You Get Me (2017), Hunter Killer (2018), The Outpost (2020), Shadow in the Cloud (2020), and Where the Crawdads Sing (2022).

Filmography

Film

Television

References

External links

1995 births
Living people
American male film actors
American male television actors
Male actors from Los Angeles